Oak City, formerly known as Goose Nest, is a town in Martin County, North Carolina, United States. The population was 317 at the 2010 census.

Geography
Oak City is located at  (35.963091, -77.305469).

Demographics

As of the census of 2000, there were 339 people, 144 households, and 91 families residing in the town. The population density was 709.7 people per square mile (272.7/km). There were 162 housing units at an average density of 339.2 per square mile (130.3/km). The racial makeup of the town was 52.51% White, 45.72% African American, 0.29% Asian, 1.18% from other races, and 0.29% from two or more races. Hispanic or Latino of any race were 1.18% of the population.

There were 144 households, out of which 22.2% had children under the age of 18 living with them, 45.1% were married couples living together, 15.3% had a female householder with no husband present, and 36.8% were non-families. 36.1% of all households were made up of individuals, and 22.2% had someone living alone who was 65 years of age or older. The average household size was 2.35 and the average family size was 3.07.

In the town, the population was spread out, with 23.3% under the age of 18, 7.1% from 18 to 24, 20.1% from 25 to 44, 22.4% from 45 to 64, and 27.1% who were 65 years of age or older. The median age was 45 years. For every 100 females, there were 81.3 males. For every 100 females age 18 and over, there were 73.3 males.

The median income for a household in the town was $26,458, and the median income for a family was $33,500. Males had a median income of $23,750 versus $15,781 for females. The per capita income for the town was $15,302. About 18.2% of families and 26.5% of the population were below the poverty line, including 37.3% of those under age 18 and 32.7% of those age 65 or over.

References

Towns in Martin County, North Carolina
Towns in North Carolina